DXEZ (88.7 FM) is a radio station owned and operated by Audiovisual Communicators in General Santos. It serves as a relay station of Monster Radio BT 99.5 in Davao.

It was formerly known as City of Dreams EZ 88.7 from 1995 to 2009, when it went off the air. It aired a Smooth Jazz format. In June 2017, the station went back on air on test broadcast. Now branded as Monster Radio EZ 88.7, airing a mix of Top 40 and Smooth Jazz. In the beginning of 2018, it became a relay station of BT 99.5 in Davao.

References

External links
Monster Radio BT 99.5 FB Page
Monster Radio BT 99.5 Website

Radio stations in General Santos